V. C. Guhanathan is a film screenwriter, director and producer who has worked on Indian Tamil films. He made his directorial debut in the 1970s, before proceeding to make successful films like Thanikattu Raja (1982) and Michael Raj (1987).

Career
Guhanathan was born in Changanai, Sri Lanka to parents Chelliah and Rajeswari in a family of seven kids. He lived in Jaffna until he was eleven years old, before shifting to India. Guhanathan attended Pachaiyappa’s College and his writing abilities were first spotted by actor MGR, who suggested he worked on film scripts and appointed him as director Chankaya's assistant. He first worked on the script for Pudhiya Boomi (1968), aged just 17. Guhanathan later worked for AVM Studios on a contract, and proceeded to write for films starring Sivaji Ganesan, NTR and Akkineni Nageswara Rao. He also wrote Kumarikottam. Under the advice of A. V. Meiyappan, Guhanathan debuted as a producer aged 20 under his banner of AVM Chithramala Combines and made successful films including Kanimuthu Paappa (1972), Rajapart Rangadurai (1973) and Petha Manam Pithu (1973). Telugu producer D. Ramanaidu then requested Guhanathan to direct his Tamil production, Madura Geetham (1977), and since he has gone on to make further films including ventures with Rajinikanth and Ajith Kumar. As of 2010, Guhanathan had written 249 scripts in nine Indian languages, directed 49 films in Tamil and Telugu and produced 51 films in Tamil. He is married to actress Jaya, who he had introduced through the film Kanimuthu Paappa.

In the early 2000s, Guhanathan's films began to perform less well commercially and as a result several of his films were launched and then left incomplete. This included shelved projects such as Mahajithan with Hamsavardhan, the Vivek-starrer Server Subbu, and Ethir Savaal which would have featured Vignesh and Ranjith.

In May 2009, Guhanathan was elected to the Film Employees Federation of South India and pledged to improve conditions and work closely with producers. During his reign, he oversaw issues including the 9th All India Film Employees Federation Conference in Chennai, the release of Enthiran (2010) and controversial statements made by actor Arya against the Tamil film industry. He quit in 2011 shortly after the 2011 State elections results were released and departed from his post simultaneously with Rama Narayanan who left the TFPC.

Filmography
Director

Writer
Pudhiya Bhoomi (1968)
Naalum Therindhavan (1968)
Annaiyum Pithavum (1969)
Enga Mama (1970)
Chitti Chellelu (1970; Telugu)
Anadhai Anandhan (1970)
Kumari Kottam (1971)
Thangaikkaaga (1971)
Suputhrudu (1971; Telugu)
Sudarum Sooravaliyum (1971)
Rani Yaar Kuzhanthai (1972)
Thaaikku Oru Pillai (1972)
Kanimuthu Paappa (1972)
Petha Manam Pithu (1973)
Pasi Hrudayalu (1973; Telugu)
Olimayamaana Ethirkaalam (1977)
Ramakrishnulu (1978; Telugu)
Chilipi Krishnudu (1978; Telugu)
Mande Gundelu (1978; Telugu)
Kalyana Chakravarthy (1980; Telugu)
Aggi Ravva (1981; Telugu)
Prema Kanuka (1981; Telugu)
Guru Sishyulu (1981; Telugu) 
Neethi Devan Mayakkam (1982)
Needhiyin Nizhal (1985)
Deivapiravi (1985)
Dharma Devathai (1986)
Shankar Guru (1987)
Per Sollum Pillai (1987)
Manithan (1987)
Ramu (1987)
Maduraikkara Thambi (1988)
Ramudu Bheemudu (1988; Telugu)
Sonthakkaran (1989)
Penn Buddhi Mun Buddhi (1989)
Mundhanai Sabatham (1989)
Akka Chellelu (1993; Telugu)
Super Police (1994; Telugu)
Kondapalli Ratayya (1995; Telugu)
Naidugari Kutumbam (1996; Telugu)
Minsara Kanavu (1997)
Divya Teacher (2001)
Kaaviyum Aaviyum Naduvula Devi (delayed)
Producer
Sudarum Sooravaliyum (1971)
Petha Manam Pithu (1973)
Deiva Kuzhandhaigal (1973)
Rajapart Rangadurai (1973)

References

External links

Living people
Sri Lankan Tamil film directors
Sri Lankan emigrants to India
Tamil film directors
Tamil film producers
Tamil screenwriters
1951 births
20th-century Indian film directors
Indian male screenwriters
Screenwriters from Tamil Nadu